Empower Field at Mile High station (formerly Invesco Field at Mile High, Sports Authority Field at Mile High and Broncos Stadium at Mile High) is a RTD light rail station in Denver, Colorado, United States. Operating as part of the E and W Lines, the station was opened on April 5, 2002, and is operated by the Regional Transportation District. It primarily serves the adjacent Empower Field at Mile High football stadium.

References 

RTD light rail stations in Denver
Railway stations in the United States opened in 2002
2002 establishments in Colorado
W Line (RTD)